Loretta Jane Swit (born Loretta Szwed; November 4, 1937) is an American stage and television actress known for her character roles. Swit is best known for her portrayal of Major Margaret "Hot Lips" Houlihan on M*A*S*H, for which she won two Emmy Awards.

Early life
Loretta Swit was born on November 4, 1937, in Passaic, New Jersey, to Lester and Nellie Szwed (née Kassack), who were both of Polish descent. Her father was a salesman and upholsterer. Swit's brother, Robert, was six years and one day her senior.  As a child, Swit was a member of a Girl Scout troop sponsored by the Holy Rosary R.C. Church of Passaic known as the Holy Rosary Scouts.

She graduated from Pope Pius XII High School in Passaic in 1955, where she had been a cheerleader, taken part in theatrical productions, and was co-captain of the women's basketball team. She graduated from Katharine Gibbs School in Montclair, New Jersey in June 1957, then was employed at a variety of clerical jobs including as a stenographer in Bloomfield, New Jersey; personal secretary to Elsa Maxwell; secretary to the ambassador from Ghana to the United Nations; and at the American Rocket Society in New York City while being trained to dance by a classmate, Elizabeth Parent-Barber, a Rockette and student at the New York School of Ballet. During this time she began developing her acting career.

She studied drama with Gene Frankel in Manhattan in New York City and considered him her acting coach. She regularly returned to his studio to speak with aspiring actors throughout her career. Swit is also a singer, having trained at the American Academy of Dramatic Arts.

Theatre
Swit's first off-broadway appearance was in the Actor's Playhouse production of "An Enemy of the People."  In 1961, Swit landed a role in the Circle in the Square production of "The Balcony" written by Jean Genet and produced by José Quintero.

In 1967, Swit toured with the national company of Any Wednesday, starring Gardner McKay. She continued as one of the Pigeon sisters opposite Don Rickles and Ernest Borgnine in a Los Angeles run of The Odd Couple.

In 1975, Swit played in Same Time, Next Year on Broadway opposite Ted Bessell. She also performed on Broadway in The Mystery of Edwin Drood. From there, she played Agnes Gooch in the Las Vegas version of Mame, starring Susan Hayward and later, Celeste Holm.

She has played Shirley Valentine, a one-woman play, since the 1990s into the 2010s, appearing in a variety of locales and revivals.

In October–November 2003, she starred as the title character in North Carolina Theatre's production of Mame in Raleigh, North Carolina.

In August–September 2010, Swit starred in the world premiere of the Mark Miller play, Amorous Crossings, at the Alhambra Dinner Theatre in Jacksonville, Florida, directed by Tod Booth.

In 2017, Swit appeared in Six Dance Lessons in Six Weeks in Buffalo, New York.

Television 
When Swit arrived in Hollywood in 1969, she performed guest roles in various television series, including Hawaii Five-O (her first TV credit), Gunsmoke, Mission: Impossible, and Mannix.

M*A*S*H

Starting in 1972, Swit played the lusty, extremely capable head nurse Major Margaret "Hot Lips" Houlihan in the television series M*A*S*H, a comedy set in a US Mobile Army Surgical Hospital during the Korean War. Swit inherited the star-making role from actress Sally Kellerman, who portrayed Houlihan in the feature film. In the first few seasons her character was single and blindly patriotic, and she had no friends among the camp surgeons and nurses, with the notable exception of her married lover, Major Frank Burns, portrayed by Larry Linville. Over time her character was considerably softened. She married a lieutenant-colonel but divorced soon after. She became good friends with her fellow officers, and her attitude towards the Koreans in and around the camp became more enlightened. The change reflected that of the series in general, from absurdist dark humor to mature comedy-drama. Swit was one of only four cast members to stay for all 11 seasons of the show, from 1972 to 1983 (the others are Alan Alda, Jamie Farr, and William Christopher).

Swit and Alda were the only actors to have been in both the pilot episode and the finale; she appeared in all but 11 of the total of 256 episodes. Swit received two Emmy Awards for her work on M*A*S*H.

Her favorite episodes are "Hot Lips & Empty Arms", "Margaret's Engagement" and "The Nurses".

She also had a close relationship with Harry Morgan, who played Colonel Sherman T. Potter. They became neighbors after the series ended, until his death on December 7, 2011. Swit continues to stay close to Alda, along with his wife, three daughters and seven grandchildren.

Cagney & Lacey
In 1981, Swit played the role of Christine Cagney in the movie pilot for the television series Cagney & Lacey but was precluded by contractual obligations from continuing the role. Actress Meg Foster portrayed Cagney for the first six episodes of the television series, then Sharon Gless took over the role.

Other TV work
Swit also guest-starred in shows such as Bonanza, The Love Boat, Win, Lose or Draw, Password, Gunsmoke, Match Game, Pyramid, The Muppet Show and Hollywood Squares. On one episode of Match Game, Swit wrote the Polish greeting "Dzień dobry" (even with the diacritical mark) on her card during the introduction. She also starred in Christmas programs such as the television version of The Best Christmas Pageant Ever and 1987's PBS special A Christmas Calendar. In 1988 she hosted Korean War-The Untold Story, a documentary on the true events of the war and went to South Korea to film it, becoming the first M*A*S*H cast member to actually visit the country outside of Jamie Farr and Alan Alda who both served there in the mid-1950s while members of the US Army. In 1992, she hosted the 26-part series Those Incredible Animals on the Discovery Channel. Swit's latest appearance was on GSN Live on October 10, 2008.

She was also in the TV movie The Last Day, 1975, with Richard Widmark and Robert Conrad.

Swit guest-starred with Mike Connors in Mannix, Episode 78, Season 4, "Figures in a Landscape", written by Paul Krasny Directed by Donn Mullally originally airing on October 10, 1970.

Swit guest-starred in Hawaii Five-O episode "Bait Once, Bait Twice", January 4, 1972.  She also played Wanda Russell in the Hawaii Five-O episode titled "Three Dead Cows at Makapuu" which aired February 25, 1970.

Personal life

Swit is an animal rights activist. She was a vegetarian for many years before becoming a vegan in 1981.

Filmography

Film

Television

Personal life

Swit married actor Dennis Holahan in 1983 and divorced him in 1995. Holahan played Per Johannsen, a Swedish diplomat who became briefly involved with Swit's character in an episode of M*A*S*H.

Swit wrote a book on needlepoint, titled A Needlepoint Scrapbook.

Awards and honors
In 1991, she won the Sarah Siddons Award for her work in Chicago theatre.
Swit received a star on the Hollywood Walk of Fame in 1989.

Bibliography

References

External links

 
 
 
 
 
 

1937 births
20th-century American actresses
Actresses from New Jersey
American Academy of Dramatic Arts alumni
American film actresses
American people of Polish descent
American stage actresses
American television actresses
Living people
Outstanding Performance by a Supporting Actress in a Comedy Series Primetime Emmy Award winners
Writers from Passaic, New Jersey
People from Passaic, New Jersey
21st-century American actresses